Robert P. Honohan (born 1940) is an Irish Gaelic football coach, selector and former player. At club he played with Donoughmore and Mitchelstown, divisional side Avondhu and at inter-county level with the Cork minor and junior teams. In a lengthy coaching career, Honohan has had All-Ireland successes at different inter-county levels.

Playing career
Honohan began his club career with Donoughmore before transferring to the Mitchelstown club after taking a teaching post in the town. He was at centre-forward when his adopted club won the 1965 Cork IFC title after beating St. Vincent's in the final. Honohan enjoyed further success by winning three North Cork JAFC titles in five seasons between 1969 and 1973. His performances at club level earned his inclusion on the Avondhu divisional team, while he also played hurling with the Ballygiblin club.

Honohan first appeared on the inter-county scene with Cork during an unsuccessful two-year stint with the minor team in 1957 and 1958. He was subsequently drafted onto the junior team and came on as a substitute when Cork beat London in the 1964 All-Ireland junior final. Honohan later captained the junior team to a second Munster JFC title in three years before losing the 1966 All-Ireland junior final to London.

Coaching career
Honohan first became involved in inter-county management when he was appointed coach of the Cork under-21 team in 1979. He held the position for 11 years, during which time he guided Cork to six All-Ireland JFC titles. Honohan combined this role with that of selector to the senior team that won the National League title in 1980 and the Munster SFC title in 1983. He also coached the Cork minor team that lost consecutive [All-Ireland Minor Football Championship|All-Ireland minor finals]] in 1986 and 1987.

Honohan was recalled as a senior team selector in 1988. The following three years saw Cork win three successive Munster SFC titles, a National League title and consecutive All-Ireland SFC titles in 1989 and 1990. After stepping away from the senior team, Honohan later returned as under-21 team coach on two occasions. He also served as Cork's delegate on the GAA's Central Council.

Honours

Player
Mitchelstown
Cork Intermediate Football Championship: 1965
North Cork Junior A Football Championship: 1969, 1972, 1973

Cork
All-Ireland Junior Football Championship: 1964
Munster Junior Football Championship: 1964, 1966 (c)

Management
Cork
All-Ireland Senior Football Championship: 1989, 1990
Munster Senior Football Championship: 1983, 1988, 1989, 1990
National Football Leagie: 1979-80, 1988-89
All-Ireland Under-21 Football Championship: 1980, 1981, 1984, 1985, 1986, 1989
Munster Under-21 Football Championship: 1979, 1980, 1981, 1982, 1984, 1985, 1986, 1989
Munster Minor Football Championship: 1986, 1987

References

1940 births
Living people
Donoughmore Gaelic footballers
Mitchelstown Gaelic footballers
Ballygiblin hurlers
Avondhu Gaelic footballers
Gaelic football managers
Gaelic football selectors
Gaelic games administrators
Irish schoolteachers